The Harvest Floor is the fourth studio album by American deathgrind band Cattle Decapitation. It was released through Metal Blade Records on January 20, 2009. The album was recorded and mixed at Sharkbite studios in Oakland, California, with engineering and production handled by Billy Anderson. The artwork was designed by Wes Benscoter, and shows the outside of a large slaughterhouse with the "general public being herded inside to meet their demise." It is the band's last album to feature bassist Troy Oftedal, and their first to feature drummer Dave McGraw. The album was inducted into Decibel's hall of fame.

A music video was released for the song "Regret and the Grave".

Sales

The Harvest Floor sold 1,700 copies in the United States in its first week of release, according to Nielsen SoundScan. The album debuted at number 16 on the Billboard Top Heatseekers chart.

Track listing

Personnel

Cattle Decapitation
 Travis Ryan – vocals
 Josh Elmore – guitar
 Troy Oftedal – bass
 David McGraw – drums

Guest musicians
 Ross Sewage (Exhumed) – vocals on "Tooth Enamel and Concrete"
 Dino Sommese (Noothgrush, Dystopia) – vocals on "The Product Alive"

Additional musicians
 Jackie Perez Gratz - electric cello
 John Wiese – electronics, atmospherics
 Jarboe - vocal melodies
 Billy Anderson - keyboard

Production
 Billy Anderson - engineering, production
 Adam Myatt - additional engineering
 Zack Ohren - engineering (drums), recording (drums)
 Alan Douches – mastering

Artwork and design
 Wes Benscoter – album artwork, photo editing
 Cain Gillis – album layout
 Sarah Remetch – photography
 Robin Laananen – photography
 Travis Ryan – art direction, concept

Studio
 Sharkbite Studios, Oakland, CA, USA – engineered, recorded

References

Cattle Decapitation albums
2009 albums
Metal Blade Records albums
Albums with cover art by Wes Benscoter
Albums produced by Billy Anderson (producer)